Gentiva Health Services is a provider of home health care, hospice and related services in the United States. Gentiva is based in Atlanta, Georgia. It is a Fortune 1000 company with over $1.7 billion in annual revenue. Gentiva is a member of the S&P 600 index, developed by S&P Global Ratings, featuring small capitalization U.S.-based stocks.  

The company offers a range of services, including nursing, physical, occupational, and speech-language therapy, cardiac and pulmonary care, disease and pain management, and other health and medical services.

Gentiva provides health services to over half a million patients annually through over 420 U.S. locations in 40 states. Its companies include Donelson, Emerald Coast, Gilbert's, Healthfield Group, Hospice of Charleston, Lazarus House, Tar Heel, Total Care, and Wiregrass.

History
Gentiva Health Services was founded on August 6, 1999 when Olsten Corporation split off its healthcare assets to form an independent, public company. Olsten Corporation was founded in 1946 by William Olsten. The company grew through the 1950s, 1960s, and 1970s. In 1971, it began focusing on its health care division under the name Olsten Healthcare. In the 1990s, its health care division began acquiring other companies. The division acquired Upjohn Health Services, and after an acquisition of Lifetime Corporation, which included Office Angels, it became the largest provider of home healthcare services, operating as Olsten Kimberly QualityCare. In 1995 Olsten Kimberly QualityCare launched CareCentrix, and a year later, the company entered the home infusion business by acquiring Quantum Health Resources. That same year it acquired NeuroCare Rehab Without Walls, and became the sole national provider for Cigna. It also acquired Nurses House Call. In 1997, it changed its name to Olsten Health Services.

In 1999, Olsten Corporation split its healthcare division into an independent, publicly traded company, named Gentiva Health Services. In its first three years of independent operation, Gentiva launched its Gentiva Orthopedics, Gentiva Cardiopulmonary, and Safe Strides programs, and it also sold its pharmaceutical services division to Accredo Health Inc. for $415 million in cash and stock and its health care staffing unit to InteliStaf Holdings Inc. and The Carlyle Group. 

In 2008, it launched its Neurorehabilitation and Senior Health programs. In 2009, Gentiva moved its headquarters from Melville, New York, to Atlanta, Georgia. By 2010, it had acquired First HomeCare of Houston, Heritage Home Care Services, The Healthfield Group, Gilbert's Home Health and Hospice, Physicians Home Health Care, and Hospice of Charleston. In that same year, it acquired Mid-State Home Health, Magna Home Health, and Medicare-Certified offices of Coordinated Home HealthCare. In 2011, the company sold its majority stake in CareCentrix to Water Street Healthcare Partners. Also in 2011, the company closed or divested 34 home health branches and nine hospice branches and sold its IDOA business to Premier Home Health Care Services, which was acquired Odyssey Healthcare of Augusta, Georgia and sold its Rehab Without Walls business to Southern Home Care Services. 

Its $1 billion purchase of Odyssey Healthcare was the largest hospice acquisition in U.S. history. In 2012, it acquired Advocate Hospice, Family Home Care Corporation and North Mississippi Hospice. In October 2013, the company acquired Harden Healthcare Holdings and Hope Hospice.

On October 9, 2014, Kindred Healthcare and Gentiva announced that the companies had entered into a definitive merger agreement under which Kindred would acquire all of the outstanding shares of Gentiva common stock. The agreement was unanimously approved by the boards of directors of both companies. The transaction was valued at $1.8 billion, including the assumption of net debt. The deal was officially signed into agreement effective January 31, 2015, with Gentiva becoming a wholly owned subsidiary of Kindred.

Divisions

Home Health
The Home Health division consists of direct home nursing and therapy services operations, including specialty programs and its consulting business. As of December 31, 2011, the Home Health segment conducted its business through more than 270 locations in 39 states. The division is separated into five geographical regions, which are further separated into geographical operating areas. Each operating area includes branch locations, through which home healthcare agencies operate.

The division offers a number of individualized home programs that are used to care for patients, by providing therapy and rehabilitation, as well as support to allow a patient to stay in their home. These programs include Gentiva Orthopedics,  Gentiva Safe Strides,  Gentiva Cardiopulmonary, Gentiva Neurorehabilitation, and Gentiva Senior Health. In addition the division provides consulting services to home health agencies, which include operational support, billing and collection activities, as well as on-site agency support and consulting.

Hospice
The Hospice division serves terminally ill patients and their families through more than 150 locations operating in 29 states. The division is separated into five geographic regions, which in turn are further separated into geographic operating areas, each of which includes branch locations. Depending on a patient's needs, each hospice patient is assigned an interdisciplinary team consisting of a physician, nurse(s), home health aide(s), medical social worker(s), chaplain, dietary counselor and bereavement coordinator, as well as other care professionals. Hospice services are provided primarily in the patient's home or other residence, such as an assisted living residence or nursing home, or in a hospital.

The Hospice division also offers individualized programs that include a dementia specialty program, a cancer specialty program, a cardiac specialty program, and a pulmonary specialty program.

References

External links
Gentiva Health Services Official Web Site.
"Gentiva to Appeal Ruling", The New York Times, May 22, 2001.
"City Plans Home Health Contract for Company Renamed After Fraud", The New York Times, July 10, 2001.
"Feds Conclude Investigation of Payments to Gentiva", Long Island Business News, November

Companies based in Atlanta
Companies based in Suffolk County, New York
Health care companies established in 1999
Health care companies based in Georgia (US State)
1999 establishments in Georgia (U.S. state)
Medical outsourcing companies of the United States
2015 mergers and acquisitions